Branded is an American Western series that aired on NBC from 1965 through 1966. It was sponsored by Procter & Gamble in its Sunday night, 8:30 p.m. Eastern time period. The series is set in the Old West, following the end of the American Civil War. The show starred Chuck Connors as Jason McCord, a United States Army cavalry captain who had been court-martialed and drummed out of the service following an unjust accusation of cowardice.

Overview

The opening title credits of each episode in the series feature a depiction of McCord's court-martial with the stripping of rank shoulder patches and his Light Cavalry Saber broken in two. He experienced cashiering and drumming out of the military. McCord retained the handle of his broken saber with attached pommel. He had the remaining blade sharpened into a long knife, which he used in many episodes.  McCord is sent out of the fort where this ceremony occurred, and the gates are closed behind him. Although the exact date of McCord's cashiering is never given, events and people depicted in episodes place the events of the series itself as sometime during the first administration of President Ulysses S. Grant (1869–72) and after William Seward negotiated the Alaska purchase. The name and location of the fort are also not given.

In the pilot episode, "The Vindicator", McCord is confronted by a newspaper reporter (Claude Akins) who wants a follow-up story on the Bitter Creek massacre. McCord refuses to cooperate. He knows that General James Reed, McCord's mentor, was on a peace mission to meet representatives of the Cheyenne nation at Bitter Creek. His unit of 31 men was attacked by a group of renegade Indians known as Dog Soldiers. During the attack, McCord realized that the old general had taken leave of his senses. McCord assumed command, but it was too late. McCord was wounded in the battle and left for dead, the only survivor. He remained in a coma for 10 days after the attack. McCord was later charged with desertion, convicted at court-martial and cashiered out of the Army.

The reporter tracks down a widow of the Bitter Creek massacre (June Lockhart). Her husband was third in command and had written several letters questioning Reed's mental state. Those letters would have been enough to grant McCord a new trial and possibly exonerate him, but McCord convinced the widow to burn the letters to protect Reed's reputation. McCord feared that if Reed's reputation were  damaged, certain people in Washington, DC, would try to start a new war with the Apaches. McCord chose never to speak about what really happened at Bitter Creek.

He traveled throughout the Old West, continually confronted by people who refused to believe his innocence, requiring him to prove them wrong.

John M. Pickard appeared in six episodes as General Phil Sheridan. Other notable guest stars included Chris Alcaide, Russ Conway, Don Collier, Burgess Meredith, John Carradine, Pat Conway, Alex Cord, Janet De Gore, Dolores del Río, Chad Everett, I. Stanford Jolley, Martin Landau, June Lockhart, Warren Oates, Gregg Palmer, Larry Pennell, Burt Reynolds, Lee Van Cleef, Dick Clark, Bruce Dern and Michael Rennie.

Production
Created by Larry Cohen, the show was co-produced for most of its run by Mark Goodson-Bill Todman Productions (which later folded ultimately into Fremantle), more widely associated with their productions of various game shows, in association with Sentinel Productions. Current distribution rights are possessed by CBS Television Distribution, the successor in interest to original distributor KingWorld. Historically, stations that air Branded have paired it with another Western series, the early Aaron Spelling production The Guns of Will Sonnett; this series, which starred veteran Western actor Walter Brennan in the title role, is also distributed by CBSTD.

Parts of the series were filmed at the Kanab movie fort and Kanab Canyon in Utah.

The series followed Chuck Connors's series The Rifleman, but it did not have that show's longevity, lasting only 48 episodes over two seasons. For the first season, 13 episodes were shot in black-and-white; the three-part story "The Mission" was shot in color.  The second season of 32 episodes was made entirely in color.

Andrew J. Fenady served as the producer, later executive producer, on the series. Fenady was also the producer of The Rebel.

Episodes

Season 1 (1965) 
All episodes in black-and-white except for the three-part episode, "The Mission," which was made in color

*In color

Parts One, Two and Three of the color episode "The Mission" were later released as a movie titled Broken Sabre, with new footage. According to Western Clippings, the re-edited movie version ends with Jason "regaining his commission and resuming his army career," thus giving an ending to the series. It also ends with Jason asking a woman to marry him and she says yes. The movie was released to theaters on May 30, 1965.

Season 2 (1965–66)
All episodes in color

Home media
Timeless Media Group released both seasons of Branded on DVD in Region 1 in 2004–2005. Season 1 was released on August 3, 2004, and season 2 was released on February 8, 2005. On February 16, 2010, Timeless Media Group released Branded: The Complete Series, a six-disc box set featuring all 48 episodes of the series and several bonus features. More-recent prints cut for syndication are used for the set, and as a result, three minutes are missing from each episode. Broken Saber (the film re-editing of "The Mission Parts One, Two, And Three") is not included.

Merchandise
A tie-in board game called Branded Game was released by Milton Bradley in 1966.

References

External links

 
 

1960s Western (genre) television series
1965 American television series debuts
1966 American television series endings
NBC original programming
Television series by CBS Studios
Television series by Fremantle (company)
Television series by Mark Goodson-Bill Todman Productions
Television series created by Larry Cohen
Black-and-white American television shows
English-language television shows
Television shows filmed in Utah